C. Morgan Babst (born November 4, 1980) is an American author.

Life and education
Babst is a native of New Orleans but spent eleven years in New York City following Hurricane Katrina. After studying creative writing at the New Orleans Center for Creative Arts, she went on to study French and Russian literature at Yale, from which she graduated cum laude. In 2008, she earned an M.F.A. in Fiction Writing from N.Y.U.

Career
Her debut novel, The Floating World, was named one of the Best Books of 2017 by Kirkus Reviews, Amazon, The Dallas Morning News, and Southern Living. The New York Times called The Floating World an elegy for post-Hurricane Katrina New Orleans. The Irish Times called it an excellent debut charting "a family's chaos after Hurricane Katrina." A review in NPR says the book described the "days after Katrina in knowing and poetic detail."

Her essay "The House of Myth: On the Architecture of White Supremacy," published in Oxford American, was selected as a Notable Essay in Best American Essays 2020 and her essay,  “Death Is a Way to Be,” published in Guernica Magazine, was selected as a Notable Essay in Best American Essays 2016. Her nonfiction, which tends to focus on New Orleans themes, has been published in The Washington Post, Guernica, the Oxford American, Saveur, Garden and Gun, Lenny Letter, and LitHub. Babst's short fiction has been published in Bayou Magazine, The Literary Review, The Butter, jmww, The Harvard Review, and The New Orleans Review.

References

External links
Video of conversation with Scott Timberg LiveTalks Los Angeles

21st-century American women writers
Living people
1980 births
Writers from New Orleans 
Writers from Louisiana